Federico D'Elía is an Argentine actor. He is a Golden Martín Fierro award winner.

References

Living people
Argentine male actors
People from La Plata
Argentine people of Danish descent
Argentine people of Italian descent
Year of birth missing (living people)